Makhun Wan is a tambon (subdistrict) of San Pa Tong District, in Chiang Mai Province, Thailand. In 2020 it had a total population of 5,074 people.

History
The subdistrict was created effective August 21, 1995 by splitting off 7 administrative villages from Makham Luang.

Administration

Central administration
The tambon is subdivided into 8 administrative villages (muban).

Local administration
The area of the subdistrict is shared by 2 local governments.
the subdistrict municipality (Thesaban Tambon) Ban Klang (เทศบาลตำบลบ้านกลาง)
the subdistrict administrative organization (SAO) Makhun Wan (องค์การบริหารส่วนตำบลมะขุนหวาน)

References

External links
Thaitambon.com on Makhun Wan

Tambon of Chiang Mai province
Populated places in Chiang Mai province